The siege of Viterbo was fought in 1243 between the Holy Roman Emperor Frederick II and the rebellious city of Viterbo, 50 km north of Rome.

History 
Frederick intervened when the Guelph party in the city expelled his garrison from the city, forcing the men, led by the imperial vicar Simeon, count of Chieti, to withdraw into the rocca of San Lorenzo. Frederick was reached by the news at Melfi, and immediately raised an army to set the matter, while the rebel citizens of Viterbo requested help from Frederick's traditional enemy, the pope. The emperor led the siege personally, but the maneuvers of his troops were unsuccessful, and the defenders were able to set on fire the imperial siege towers. The siege thus resulted in a humiliation for Frederick.

Pope Innocent IV, fearing that the event could start a war with the emperor, intervened; his legate, Cardinal Otto of San Nicola in Carcere, convinced the rebels to sign a treaty of peace. However, after the signature, they treacherously attacked and massacred the imperial garrison. The pope punished the citizens of Viterbo only with a pecuniary mulct, and retained control of the city in the person of his legate, Ranieri of Viterbo.

See also
 Frederick II, Holy Roman Emperor
 Guelphs and Ghibellines
 History of Viterbo

References

Sources

Viterbo 1243
Viterbo 1243
Viterbo
13th century in Italy
Viterbo
Viterbo
1240s in the Holy Roman Empire
1243 in Europe
Frederick II, Holy Roman Emperor